Revír is a 2023 Czech TV series set in hunting environment. It was directed by Luboš Svoboda and written by Vratislav Šlapák and Luboš Svoboda. The series was produced by Wonder Prague for TV Seznam. David Prachař, Jaromír Dulava, Kristína Svarinská, Ondřej Pavelka, Michal Opletal and others appear in the main roles. The series premiere is set for 25 March 2023 on TV Seznam.

The eight episodes comedy series Revír reveals the life of the oldest Czech hunting association s  members and their lands. The protagonists will face not only wild animals or the pitfalls of love, but above all they must defend their territory from a sneaky and rich businessman.

Cast
 David Prachař
 Jaromír Dulava
 Kristína Svarinská
 Ondřej Pavelka
 Antonin Mašek

Production
The series was filmed in the village of Skřivaň in the Central Bohemia region during August and September 2022.

External links
Website (in Czech)
IMDb.com

References 

2023 Czech television series debuts
Czech comedy television series
TV Seznam original programming